Philip Nicholas Furbank FRSL (23 May 1920 – 27 June 2014) was an English biographer, critic and academic. His most significant biography was the well-received life of his friend E. M. Forster.

Career 
After Reigate Grammar School, Furbank entered Emmanuel College, Cambridge. After graduating with a First in English, he served in the army. He became a corporal in the Royal Electrical and Mechanical Engineers and was in Italy in 1945.  He returned to Emmanuel as a teaching Fellow in 1947. While in Cambridge Furbank became a close friend of the novelist  E. M. Forster, and also of the mathematician Alan Turing, whose literary executor he would become.

Furbank moved to  London in 1953 and worked as an editor and librarian. He contributed reviews to The Listener. In 1972 he became a professor of the Open University

In 1960 in London he married the poet and critic Patricia Beer. The marriage was dissolved by 1964 when she remarried.

Works
Furbank's best known work was his sympathetic and widely acclaimed biography E. M. Forster: A Life. Forster had recognised that a biography was inevitable and had originally asked the novelist William Plomer to write one. Plomer found it impossible to describe Forster's sexuality and Furbank was asked instead. Forster's old college, King's College, made Furbank a fellow for the two years before Forster's death in 1970 to support the writing and the biography was published in two parts in 1977 and 1978.

Furbank won a Truman Capote Award for Literary Criticism for his Diderot: A Critical Biography (1992).  He also edited the works of Daniel Defoe and made major contributions to the question of attributions to Defoe in A Critical Bibliography of Daniel Defoe, The Canonisation of Daniel Defoe, and A Political Biography of Daniel Defoe all co-written with W. R. Owens. Furbank also helped oversee the publication of Alan Turing's collected works.

Furbank's other books include ones on the poet Mallarmé and the painter Poussin, Italo Svevo: The Man and the Writer (1966) and Behalf (1999) on political thought.

References
Faber & Faber page

Notes

External links
 List of works by Furbank on worldcat.org  Retrieved on 6 January 2011
Misreading Gulliver's Travels

English literary critics
English biographers
1920 births
2014 deaths
Alumni of Emmanuel College, Cambridge
Academics of the Open University
Alan Turing
Fellows of the Royal Society of Literature
20th-century biographers
The New York Review of Books people
British Army personnel of World War II
Royal Electrical and Mechanical Engineers soldiers